State Route 215 (SR 215) is a primary state highway in the U.S. state of Virginia. Known as Vint Hill Road, the state highway runs  from U.S. Route 15 and US 29 at Buckland east to SR 28 near Bristow. SR 215 forms part of a connection between Warrenton and Manassas.

Route description

SR 215 begins at an intersection with US 15 and US 29 (Lee Highway) at Buckland just west of the Fauquier – Prince William county line. The state highway heads southeast parallel to the county line, then passes to the north of the Vint Hill Village community as it curves east and enters Prince William County. SR 215 passes through the hamlet of Greenwich and passes to the south of the suburban community of Linton Hall. The state highway reaches its eastern terminus at SR 28 (Nokesville Road) near Bristow.

Major intersections

References

External links

Virginia Highways Project: VA 215

215
State Route 215
State Route 215